Geometry is the second album by the electronic musician Jega, released in 2000 on the Planet Mu and Matador labels.

Track listing

Reception

Sam Eccleston, writing for Pitchfork, called the album "a fascinating, if not moving, musical experience". Mike Bruno of the Chicago Reader wrote a similarly positive review and compared it with Jega's previous album Spectrum, stating that Geometry for Jega "represents a step toward being taken more seriously as an electronic composer".

References

External links
Geometry at the Planet Mu website

2000 albums
Jega (musician) albums
Planet Mu albums